Cinnamyl alcohol or styron is an organic compound that is found in esterified form in storax, Balsam of Peru, and cinnamon leaves.  It forms a white crystalline solid when pure, or a yellow oil when even slightly impure. It can be produced by the hydrolysis of storax.

Cinnamyl alcohol has a distinctive odour described as "sweet, balsam, hyacinth, spicy, green, powdery, cinnamic" and is used in perfumery and as a deodorant.

Cinnamyl alcohol is naturally occurrent only in small amount, so its industrial demand is usually fulfilled by chemical synthesis starting from cinnamaldehyde.

Properties
The compound is a solid at room temperature, forming colourless crystals that melt upon gentle heating. As is typical of most higher-molecular weight alcohols, it is sparingly soluble in water at room temperature, but highly soluble in most common organic solvents.

Safety 
Cinnamyl alcohol has been found to have a sensitising effect on some people and as a result is the subject of a Restricted Standard issued by IFRA (International Fragrance Association).

Glycosides 
Rosarin and rosavin are cinnamyl alcohol glycosides isolated from Rhodiola rosea.

References 

Merck Index, 11th Edition, 2305.

Flavors
Primary alcohols
Phenylpropanoids
Perfume ingredients